The Skipton Line was a branch line running south west from Ballarat to the town of Skipton, Victoria. The line branched from the main Serviceton Western line just after Ballarat at the Linton junction and was 55
kilometres long. The line was opened on 10 October 1890 and finally closed on 4 December 1986. The line had
previously closed to passenger services in 1972.

It is now the Ballarat-Skipton Rail Trail.

References 

Closed regional railway lines in Victoria (Australia)
Railway lines opened in 1890